The Economic Cooperation Organization Trade Agreement or ECOTA is a preferential trade agreement reached on 17 July 2003 at the ECO summit in Islamabad whereby a preferential trade region was formed between the countries of Afghanistan, Azerbaijan, Iran, Kazakhstan, Kyrgyzstan, Pakistan, Tajikistan, Turkey, Turkmenistan and Uzbekistan. As of 2008, the ECOTA is in effect. As part of ECO Vision 2025, Afghanistan, Iran, Pakistan, Tajikistan and Turkey agreed to implement free trade area by 2025.

See also
Gül Train
Shanghai Cooperation Organisation
Middle East economic integration
White card system
Economic Cooperation Organization

References

External links
 ECO's Website
 ECO's Cultural Institute
 ECO's Trade and Development Bank
 ECO Science Foundation

 

Trade blocs
International economic organizations
International organizations based in Asia
Post-Soviet alliances
Economy of Afghanistan
Economy of Azerbaijan
Foreign trade of Iran
Economy of Kazakhstan
Economy of Kyrgyzstan
Foreign trade of Pakistan
Economy of Tajikistan
Foreign trade of Turkey
Economy of Turkmenistan
Economy of Uzbekistan
Afghanistan–Pakistan relations
Afghanistan–Tajikistan relations
Pakistan–Tajikistan relations
Kyrgyzstan–Tajikistan relations
Kyrgyzstan–Uzbekistan relations
Tajikistan–Uzbekistan relations
Pakistan–Uzbekistan relations
Pakistan–Turkey relations
Pakistan–Turkmenistan relations
Iran–Pakistan relations
Kazakhstan–Kyrgyzstan relations
Kazakhstan–Uzbekistan relations
Iran–Turkey relations
Azerbaijan–Kazakhstan relations
Kazakhstan–Pakistan relations
Economic Cooperation Organization